Arabi is a town in Crisp County, Georgia, United States. As of the 2010 census, it had a population of 586.

History
The first permanent settlement at Arabi was made in 1888. According to tradition, the name "Arabi"  was coined after a local surname. The town was chartered in 1891.

Demographics

As of the census of 2000, there were 456 people, 185 households, and 120 families residing in the town. The racial makeup of the town was 74.78% White, 24.34% African American and 0.88% Asian.

There were 185 households, out of which 29.7% had children under the age of 18 living with them, 52.4% were married couples living together, 10.3% had a female householder with no husband present, and 34.6% were non-families. 32.4% of all households were made up of individuals, and 15.1% had someone living alone who was 65 years of age or older.  The average household size was 2.46 and the average family size was 3.09.

In the town, the population was spread out, with 24.8% under the age of 18, 8.6% from 18 to 24, 28.3% from 25 to 44, 23.7% from 45 to 64, and 14.7% who were 65 years of age or older.  The median age was 38 years. For every 100 females, there were 103.6 males.  For every 100 females age 18 and over, there were 100.6 males.

The median income for a household in the town was $24,327, and the median income for a family was $26,750. Males had a median income of $27,321 versus $13,281 for females. The per capita income for the town was $11,157.  About 13.1% of families and 19.9% of the population were below the poverty line, including 26.4% of those under age 18 and 20.0% of those age 65 or over.

Geography
Arabi is located in southern Crisp County at  (31.833473, -83.734912). U.S. Route 41 passes through the center of the town as Bedgood Avenue, leading north  to Cordele, the county seat, and south  to Ashburn. Interstate 75 passes through the eastern side of the town, with access from Exit 92, and leads north  to Macon and south  to Valdosta.

Notable person
 T. Graham Brown, country music singer

See also

 List of municipalities in Georgia (U.S. state)

References

External links

 

Towns in Crisp County, Georgia
Towns in Georgia (U.S. state)